Thomas Dexter Jakes (born June 9, 1957), known as T. D. Jakes, is an American bishop, author and filmmaker. He is the bishop of The Potter's House, a non-denominational American megachurch. Jakes's church services and Evangelistic sermons are broadcast on The Potter's Touch.

Biography 
Thomas Dexter Jakes was born on June 9, 1957, in South Charleston, West Virginia, and grew up in Vandalia, West Virginia.

Beliefs 
Although Jakes was converted and ordained within Oneness Pentecostalism, he revealed in an interview with Mark Driscoll in 2012 that he affirms the Trinity, although Jakes did not affirm the eternality of the individual persons of the Trinity, which is denied by Oneness churches.

Jakes is an advocate of sexual abstinence and has made appearances advocating it on Good Morning America and Dr. Phil.

In 2015, Jakes stated that his views on homosexuality and LGBT rights are evolving. However, Jakes stated that his words were misinterpreted and that while he does not support same-sex marriage, he "respect[s] the rights that this country affords those that disagree".

Ministry 
In 1982, at age 25, Jakes became the pastor of Greater Emanuel Temple of Faith, a storefront church in Smithers, West Virginia, with ten members. In 1988, he joined the denomination Higher Ground Always Abounding Assemblies founded by Bishop Sherman Watkins. In 1990, Jakes moved to South Charleston, West Virginia, and his congregation grew again, to 300 members. In 1993 he moved to Cross Lanes, West Virginia.

In 1995, he founded "TDJ Enterprises" which publishes his books and produces his films. From 1995 to 1996, Jakes hosted "Get Ready," a weekly radio and television show with national distribution through syndication. In 1996, Jakes, founded The Potter's House in Dallas, Texas, a non-denominational church. Located on a 34-acre hilltop campus, the Potter's House features a 5,000-seat auditorium, as well as offices for employees and staff.

In 2005, Jakes accompanied President George W. Bush on his visit to the areas devastated by Hurricane Katrina. On January 20, 2009, Jakes led the early morning prayer service for President Barack Obama at St. John's Church in Washington, D.C., according to NBC News.

In 2009, Jakes partnered with Dr. Phil McGraw, Jay McGraw, and CBS Television Distribution to launch a syndicated, secular talk show; however, due to economic issues within the syndicated television market, the program never premiered.

In July 2015, Tegna, Inc. and Debmar-Mercury announced that a new secular talk show hosted by Jakes called T. D. Jakes would air a test run on Tegna stations in Atlanta, Cleveland, Dallas, and Minneapolis from August 17 to September 11, 2015. On May 10, 2016, Tegna announced that it would begin airing Jakes's show September 12 in over 50 markets across the country. On March 15, 2017, Tegna announced that T. D. Jakes was cancelled due to poor ratings and low clearances.

Media

Discography 
 Woman Thou Art Loosed (1997)
 Live From the Potter’s House (1998)
 The Storm Is Over (2001)

T. D. Jakes is also featured on Swedish DJ Steve Angello's dance/electronic track Rejoice.

Writings 
 Intimacy With God
 Loved by
 Before you throw in the towel
 Naked And Not Ashamed?
 Loose That Man And Let Him Go
 Loose That Man And Let Him Go Workbook
 Positioning Yourself To Prosper
 Reposition Yourself: Living a Life Without Limits
 He-Motions: Even Strong Men Struggle
 Help! I'm Raising My Children Alone: A Guide for Single Ladies and Those Who Sometimes Feel They Are
 Ten Commandments of Working in a Hostile Environment
 Promises From God For Single Women
 Woman, Thou Art Loosed: Healing the Wounds of the Past
 Woman, Thou Art Loosed Devotional
 The Lady, Her Lover, and Her Lord
 Maximize the Moment : God's Action Plan for Your Life
 So You Call Yourself a Man?: Finally... a Devotional for Ordinary Men with Extraordinary Potential
 God's Leading Lady
 His Lady
 Jesus Walks (with me)
 Lay Aside the Weight
 Daddy Loves His Girls
 The Greatest Investment
 Mama Made the Difference
 Don't Drop the Mic
 TD Jakes Speaks to Men
 Overcoming the Enemy
 From the Cross to Pentecost
 Life Overflowing: Six Pillars for Abundant Living
 Not Easily Broken, 2006
 Before You Do: Making Great Decisions That You Won't Regret, 2008, Atria Books. 
 The Memory Quilt: A Christmas Story for Our Times, 2009
 Let it Go: Forgive So You Can Be Forgiven, 2012
 Instinct: The Power To Unleash Your Inborn Drive, 2014, Hachette Book Group. 
 Destiny: Step Into Your Purpose, August 2015, Hachette Book Group. 
 Soar!: Build Your Vision from the Ground Up, 2017, FaithWords.
 Crushing: God Turns Pressure Into Power, April 2019, Hachette Book Group.

 Filmography 
 2004: Woman Thou Art Loosed — As himself (based on Jakes's novel of the same name)
 2009: Not Easily Broken — Allen (based on another Jakes novel)
 2011: Jumping the Broom — Reverend James
 2010: Munya — Reverend Brian
 2012: Woman Thou Art Loosed: On the 7th Day – As himself
 2012: Sparkle – Producer
 2014: Heaven Is for Real – Producer
 2014: Winnie Mandela – Producer
 2016: Miracles from Heaven – Producer
 2018: Faith Under Fire – Executive Producer
 2019: A Dog's Way Home – Executive Producer

 Legacy and honors 
PBS Religion and Ethics Newsweekly have named Jakes among America's "Top 10 Religious Leaders." Time magazine featured Jakes on the cover of its September 17, 2001, issue with the
provocative question, "Is This Man the Next Billy Graham?"

In 2003, Jakes' album A Wing and a Prayer won the "Best Gospel or Chorus Album" at the 46th Grammy Awards. He has also received Grammy and Dove Award nominations for the gospel album Live at The Potter's House. In 2004, he received the NAACP's President's Award. Jakes was selected in Oprah's SuperSoul100 list of visionaries and influential leaders in 2016.

 Personal life 
On the PBS program African American Lives'', Jakes had his DNA analyzed; his Y chromosome showed that he is descended from the Igbo people of Nigeria. According to his family history, it was suggested that he is also descended from them through his grandmother.

References

Further reading 
 "Biography. Bishop T.D. Jakes. — T.D. Jakes Website. Retrieved November 24, 2011.
 Early Life -Guide to Resources for the Study of West Virginia Authors and Appalachian Literary Traditions
 Annie Merner Pfeiffer Library: TD Jakes. http://www.wvwc.edu/library/wv_authors/td_jakes.html

External links 
 T. D. Jakes Ministries official website
 
 Watch T.D. Jakes Online 

1957 births
Living people
20th-century Christians
21st-century Christians
African-American Christian clergy
American bishops
American Charismatics
American Pentecostal pastors
American people of Igbo descent
American television evangelists
Film producers from Texas
Grammy Award winners
Nondenominational Christianity
Pentecostals from Texas
Pentecostal writers
People from Cross Lanes, West Virginia
People from South Charleston, West Virginia
Television evangelists
Writers from Dallas